St. James' Church is a historic Episcopal church located at Cleveland in Oswego County, New York.  It is a frame Gothic Revival style structure built in 1867.  It is a  rectangular board and batten building composed of a nave, front entry, chancel, and tower which rests on a random coursed stone foundation.

It was listed on the National Register of Historic Places in 1996.

References

Churches on the National Register of Historic Places in New York (state)
Episcopal church buildings in New York (state)
Carpenter Gothic church buildings in New York (state)
Churches completed in 1867
19th-century Episcopal church buildings
Churches in Oswego County, New York
National Register of Historic Places in Oswego County, New York